The Adventures of Valdo & Marie is a 1996 adventure educational video game for Windows by Ubi Soft Entertainment Software.

PC Team praised the game's commitment to being an educational historical adventure. Joystick felt it offered a beautiful experience to players. Personal Computer Magazine thought the game offered a "highly entertaining learning environment".

The game sold 100,000 copies in France alone.

References 

1996 video games
Adventure games
Educational video games
Ubisoft games
Video games developed in France
Windows games
Windows-only games